Alma Murray (1854–1945) was an English actress.

Life
She was born in London into a theatrical family, the daughter of actors Leigh Murray and his wife Sarah Mannering. Her father's real surname was Wilson.  His brother was Gaston Murray (real name Gaston Parker Wilson) whose daughters often used the double-barreled stage-name 'Gaston-Murray' and were well-known performers with the D'Oyly Carte Opera Company.

Murray's first appearance was at the Olympic in 1870 as Sacharissa in The Princess.  She played at the Lyceum with Irving in 1879 and at different West End theatres from 1882 to 1897, and took a prominent part in the few attempts to produce the dramas of Shelley and Browning, playing Beatrice in The Cenci (1886) and Mildred in A Blot in the 'Scutcheon (1888).  She played Helena in John Todhunter's Helena in Troas (1886). In 1884 at the Comedy Theatre, London, she played in The New Woman, with Fred Terry and Cyril Maude, in 1885 A Leader of Men with Marion Terry and H.B.Irving, and in 1890 A Modern Marriage, opposite Ellaline Terriss and Lewis Waller. Alma Murray married the poet Alfred William Forman (1840-1925), the first translator of Wagner's Der Ring des Nibelungen.  She played Mrs. Maylie in Oliver Twist (1905), (1912), the Queen in Pelleas and Melisande (1911), Lady Dedmond in Galsworthy's Fugitive (1913), and Mrs. Eynsford-Hill in Shaw's Pygmalion (1914).

A collection of letters between Murray and George Bernard Shaw was privately published in Edinburgh in 1927.

References

External links
Portraits
Blanche Gaston-Murray
Jessie Louise Gaston_Murray

English stage actresses
1854 births
1945 deaths
Place of birth missing